The canton of Nogent-sur-Marne is a French canton, located in the arrondissement of Nogent-sur-Marne, in the Val-de-Marne département (Île-de-France région).

Composition
Since the French canton reorganisation which came into effect in March 2015, the communes of the canton of Nogent-sur-Marne are:
 Le Perreux-sur-Marne
 Nogent-sur-Marne (partly)

See also
Cantons of the Val-de-Marne department
Communes of the Val-de-Marne department

References

Nogent-sur-Marne